Chore were a Canadian post-hardcore band from Dunnville, Ontario.

History

Chore formed in January 1995.  They released three albums on the Sonic Unyon indie label in Hamilton, Ontario: Another Plebeian came out in 1997 and Take My Mask and Breathe in 1999. They also contributed an exclusive recording to Redstar Records' 1999 Various Artists compilation The Sound and the Fury. Chore was approached by Revelation Records and took part in NXNE in 2000, but decided to remain with Sonic Unyon. In 2001, they played in Toronto at Lee's Palace with other Sonic Unyon bands.

The Coastaline Fire was released in 2002 to positive reviews, and was also sold in Japan beginning in 2003.

Their video for the single "General Warning" won a "Best of the Wedge 1999" award from broadcaster MuchMusic, while the video for "The Hitchhiker" saw airplay on MuchLOUD and MTV's 120 Minutes. The songs "The Hitchhiker" and "Burr" were both featured in an episode from the first season of Fox's 24.

Chore disbanded in April 2004. Lead vocalist Chris Bell continued to produce music under the moniker Alive and Living, until recently joining Mitch Bowden and David Dunham to perform in Don Vail and The Priddle Concern, along with Bill Priddle (formerly of Treble Charger).

The band reunited in December 2010 for a string of shows, including opening slots for Billy Talent, Alexisonfire, and Wintersleep.

Discography
Another Plebeian (1997)
Take My Mask and Breathe (1999)
The Coastaline Fire (2002)

See also

Music of Canada
Canadian rock
List of bands from Canada
List of Canadian musicians
:Category:Canadian musical groups

References

External links
Chore's entry at the Canadian Indie Band Database
Chore's entry at garageband.com

Musical groups established in 1995
Canadian indie rock groups
Musical groups from the Regional Municipality of Niagara
Musical groups disestablished in 2004
1995 establishments in Ontario
2004 disestablishments in Ontario
Sonic Unyon artists